This is a list of schools in the Roman Catholic Archdiocese of Atlanta.

K-12 schools
 Holy Spirit Preparatory School, (Atlanta and Sandy Springs), Independent
 Notre Dame Academy, Duluth, Independent
 Pinecrest Academy, Cumming, Independent

Secondary schools
 7-12
 Marist School, Brookhaven, Independent

 High schools

 Blessed Trinity Catholic High School, Roswell
 Cristo Rey Atlanta Jesuit High School, Atlanta, Independent
 Monsignor Donovan Catholic High School, Athens, Independent
 Our Lady of Mercy Catholic High School, Fayetteville
 St. Pius X Catholic High School, DeKalb County

Elementary schools

Christ the King, Buckhead, Atlanta
Holy Redeemer, Johns Creek - The school opened in fall 1999.
Immaculate Heart of Mary (North Druid Hills CDP, unincorporated DeKalb County) - The school initially had 238 pupils when it opened in August 1958. An addition was installed in circa the late 1960s/early 1970s. In 2011 a crisis occurred at the school after an anonymous donor announced a plan to give $1 million to the school; the principal resigned suddenly; parents expressed the belief that the pastor asked her to leave, and they feared the planned donation would not be given after all. Circa 2011 the school had about 500 pupils. The enrollment was about the same in 2013.
Our Lady of the Assumption, Brookhaven - It was established in 1951.
Our Lady of Victory, unincorporated area, Tyrone address. - It opened in September 1999.
Queen of Angels, Roswell - Opened in September 1999. Students come from 18 parishes.
St. Catherine of Siena, Kennesaw - It opened in fall 2002. It initially served up to grade three, but each subsequent year it added a grade until it got to grade 8.
St. John Neumann Regional, unincorporated Gwinnett County, Lilburn address. - It was established on January 5, 1986 and opened in August of that year.
St. John the Evangelist, Hapeville - It opened in 1954.
St. Joseph, Athens - It was established in 1949.  it had 149 students, with 78% of them being Catholic; it had 56 students at the middle school level.
St. Joseph, Marietta - It opened in September 1953.
St. Jude the Apostle, Sandy Springs - Opened September 4, 1962
St. Mary, Rome - It was established in 1945, and a new school building was established after the school acquired a section of the former Cooper Estate in 1960. Its current building opened in fall 2001.
St. Peter Claver Regional, (Candler-McAfee CDP, unincorporated DeKalb County, near Decatur)
St. Thomas More, Decatur - It opened on September 1, 1950. At first it only had elementary grades and its initial enrollment was 150. A dedicated elementary building opened in 1955, and an addition for kindergarten classes with two rooms was placed in 1994.

Former schools
 High schools
 Sacred Heart High School (Atlanta) - Girls' school, closed in 1958 with students moved to St. Pius X.
 Sophia Academy (merged into Notre Dame Academy in 2017)

 Grade schools
 Our Lady Of Lourdes School (Atlanta) - It opened in 1912.
 Sacred Heart Grammar School (Atlanta) - Established in 1909.
 Saint Anthony of Padua School (West End, Atlanta) It was established in 1912. In 1997 it had 125 students. It permanently closed in Spring 2001

References

Atlanta, Roman Catholic Archdiocese of
Education in Atlanta
Schools
Schools in the Roman Catholic Archdiocese of Atlanta
Atlanta